The 36th Golden Horse Awards took place on 12 December 1999 at Sun Yat-sen Memorial Hall in Taipei, Taiwan.

References

36th
1999 film awards
1999 in Taiwan